Bargnolino is an Italian variation of sloe gin, made by soaking sloe fruits from the blackthorn plant, Prunus spinosa, with sugar and spices in spirit alcohol. This results in a reddish, sweet liquor, around 40-45% alcohol by volume, although results vary by recipe used. Bargnolino is often chilled before serving.

References

Italian liqueurs